Hydriomena mississippiensis is a species of geometrid moth in the family Geometridae. It is found in North America.

The MONA or Hodges number for Hydriomena mississippiensis is 7252.

References

Further reading

 
 

Hydriomena
Articles created by Qbugbot
Moths described in 1952